The Dhuwala (Duala, Du:ala) are an indigenous Australian people of eastern Arnhem Land in the Northern Territory.

Country
Norman Tindale stated that the Dhuwala's lands were basically coextensive with those assigned to the Dhuwal, the two peoples inhabiting the same territory but being distinguished by linguistic differences, moiety type, and clan estate localities. More specifically, he placed them northeast of an imaginary lines linking between Castlereagh Bay and Port Bradshaw, Cape Shield, adding that they also could be found as far south as the Koolatong River.

Social Organisation
Whereas the Dhuwal clan structure was exclusively of the Dua moiety type, by a complementary logic, that of the Dhuwala clans, seven in number, all belonged to the Yirritja moiety.
 1. Kupapuingu.
 2. Kujamirilili. (Guyamirrilili, Gwijamil, Gwiyamil).
 3. Gumatj. (Gomaidj, Gumadji, Komaits, Gumaitj, Gomaid).
 4. Manggalili.
 5. Makarwanalmiri. (Makarrwanhalmirri, Mugarganalmiri).
 6. Wobulkara. (Wulkara, Wobulgarra, Wowulkarra, Obulgara, Wolgara).
 7. Madarpa. (Mararba, Madarrpa, Maderpa, Jithuwa, Jiduwa, Malarbardjuradj, Malarrbartjuray).

Notes

Citations

Sources

Yolngu